Holy Cross or Saint Cross may refer to:
 the instrument of the crucifixion of Jesus
 Christian cross, a frequently used religious symbol of Christianity
 True Cross, supposed remnants of the actual cross upon which Jesus was crucified
 Feast of the Cross, a commemoration most often celebrated on September 14

Holy Cross may also refer to:

Educational institutions 
 College of the Holy Cross, Worcester, Massachusetts
 Holy Cross Crusaders, the athletic teams of Holy Cross at Worcester
 Holy Cross School (disambiguation)
 Holy Cross College (disambiguation)
 Hellenic College and Holy Cross Greek Orthodox School of Theology, in Brookline, Massachusetts
 Pontifical University of the Holy Cross, Rome, Italy

Churches
 Holy Cross Church (disambiguation)

Communities 
Order of the Holy Cross refers to several institutions by that name:
 Canons Regular of the Holy Cross of Coimbra (ORC), a Catholic religious order founded in Portugal in 1131 and refounded in 1977
 Canons Regular of the Order of the Holy Cross (OSC), alias the Crosiers, a Catholic religious order founded in 1211 at Clairlieu near Huy, Belgium
 Order of the Holy Cross (OHC), an Anglican Benedictine community based in New York state in the United States
 Patriarchal Order of the Holy Cross of Jerusalem, a knightly order conferred by the Melkite Greek Catholic Church

Catholic religious orders 
 Congregation of Holy Cross, priests and brothers
 Heiligenkreuz Abbey, or Holy Cross monastery in Austria
 Holy Cross Abbey, Virginia
 Holy Cross Abbey, in Tipperary, Ireland
 Marianites of Holy Cross, of Le Mans, France, and New Orleans, Louisiana
 Priestly Society of the Holy Cross, association of Opus Dei priests
 Sisters of Holy Cross of Montreal, Canada and Manchester, New Hampshire
 Sisters of the Holy Cross, of Notre Dame, Indiana

Anglican religious orders 
 Community of the Holy Cross, a Benedictine community of nuns in England
 Society of the Holy Cross, priests in the Anglican Communion
 Society of the Holy Cross (Korea) (SHC), an order of women in the Anglican Church of Korea
 Order of the Holy Cross (OHC), an Anglican Benedictine community in New York
 Society of the Companions of the Holy Cross (SCHC), lay and ordained members of the Anglican Communion

Eastern Orthodox associations 
 Monastery of the Cross, in Jerusalem

Places

Canada 
 Holy Cross Mountain, Alberta

Ireland 
 Holycross, County Tipperary, Ireland
 Holy Cross Church, Ardoyne, Belfast

Poland 
 Świętokrzyskie Mountains (Holy Cross Mountains), in central Poland
 Świętokrzyskie Voivodeship (Holy Cross Voivodeship), a province of central Poland

United Kingdom 
 Holy Cross, Worcestershire, England

United States 
 Holy Cross, Alaska
 Holy Cross, Iowa
 Holy Cross, Kentucky
 Holy Cross, New Orleans, Louisiana
 Holy Cross, Wisconsin
 Holy Cross Township, Clay County, Minnesota
 Holy Cross Cemetery (disambiguation), numerous cemeteries
 Mount of the Holy Cross, a mountain in Colorado
 Holy Cross Parish, New Britain, Connecticut

Other 
 Holy Cross dispute, surrounding Holy Cross Primary School in Ardoyne, Belfast in 2001 and 2002

See also 
 Order of the Holy Cross (disambiguation)
 Holyrood (disambiguation)
 Sainte-Croix (disambiguation)
 Santa Cruz (disambiguation)
 Santa Croce (disambiguation)
 St Cross (disambiguation)
 Hospet Church, in Dakshina Kannada, is one of the ancient churches in the Mangalore Diocese of India